The Best of UFO (1974–1983) is a greatest hits collection by the British hard rock band UFO, released in 2008. All songs were digitally remastered in 2007 and 2008.

Track listing
"Rock Bottom" - 6:30
"Oh My" - 2:24
"Let It Roll" - 3:56
"Shoot Shoot" - 3:38
"Can You Roll Her" - 2:56
"I'm a Loser" - 3:53
"Natural Thing" - 4:00
"Lights Out" - 4:30
"Love to Love" - 7:04
"Too Hot to Handle" - 3:37
"Only You Can Rock Me" (7" version) - 3:31
"Doctor Doctor" (live 7" edit) - 3:41
"Lettin' Go" - 4:02
"Young Blood" (7" edit) - 3:06
"Lonely Heart" (7" edit) - 4:13
"Chains Chains" - 3:25
"Let It Rain" - 4:01
"We Belong to the Night" - 3:59
"When It's Time to Rock" - 3:46

References

2008 greatest hits albums
UFO (band) compilation albums
Chrysalis Records compilation albums